The Amphisbaenidae (common name: worm lizards) are a family of amphisbaenians, a group of limbless vertebrates.

Geographic range
Amphisbaenids occur in  South America, some Caribbean islands, Europe, and sub-Saharan Africa.

Taxonomy
One deep-branching and somewhat aberrant genus, Blanus, is native to Europe, and may represent a distinct family. More recent sources indeed place it in the family Blanidae.

Description
Members of the family Amphisbaenidae are limbless, burrowing reptiles with carnivorous diets. As in other amphisbaenians, the body bears rings of scales, which gives amphisbaenids a worm-like appearance. The head is massively constructed and used for burrowing, with powerful jaws and large, recurved teeth used for seizing prey. Some species have a spade-like head, while others have a narrow keel on the head, and still others have a rounded skull. The eyes are highly reduced, while the ear bone, or stapes in the middle ear, is large and massive. Together with another bone, the extracollumella, the stapes detects vibrations caused by prey items, allowing amphisbaenids to hunt for invertebrates under ground. In this respect, apparently evolution exists  convergent to the burrowing mammalian family Chrysochloridae, in which the malleus in the middle ear is greatly enlarged.

Extant genera

Over 170 extant species are in the family, grouped into 12 genera:

Fossil genera 

A number of extinct taxa are known from the fossil record:

References

Further reading
Gans C (2005). "Checklist and Bibliography of the Amphisbaenia of the World". Bulletin of the American Museum of Natural History (289): 1-130.
Goin CJ, Goin OB, Zug GR (1978). Introduction to Herpetology, Third Edition. San Francisco: W.H. Freeman and Company. xi + 378 pp. . (Family Amphisbaenidae, pp. 276–277).

External links

http://www.jcvi.org/reptiles/families/amphisbaenidae.php

 
Amphisbaenians
Reptile families
Taxa named by John Edward Gray
Extant Maastrichtian first appearances